Tales of Old Vienna or Carl Michael Ziehrer's Tales of Old Vienna (German: Carl Michael Ziehrers Märchen aus Alt-Wien) is a 1923 Austrian silent film directed by Wilhelm Thiele and starring Grit Haid, Frieda Kiesewetter and Hugo Thimig. It is based on the life of the composer Karl Michael Ziehrer. Thiele had directed a first film The Last Waltz King about him the previous year.

Cast
 Hans Lackner as Karl Michael Ziehrer
 Grit Haid as Donaunixe  
 Hugo Thimig as Wendelin Frohgemut sen.  
 Frieda Kiesewetter as Lore, seine Frau  
 Hans Thimig as Wendelin Frohgemut jun.  
 Anton Maria Girardi 
 Harry Norbert 
 Frieda Linck

References

Bibliography
 Murphy, Robert. Directors in British and Irish Cinema: A Reference Companion. British Film Institute, 2006.

External links

1923 films
Austrian historical films
1920s historical films
Austrian silent feature films
Films directed by Wilhelm Thiele
Films set in the 19th century
Films set in Vienna
Films about classical music and musicians
Films about composers
Films with screenplays by Wilhelm Thiele
Austrian black-and-white films
Films set in Austria-Hungary